Wojciech Borecki (born 4 April 1955) is a Polish football manager.

References

1955 births
Living people
Polish footballers
Polish football managers
Podbeskidzie Bielsko-Biała managers
ŁKS Łódź managers
GKS Katowice managers
Piast Gliwice managers
KSZO Ostrowiec Świętokrzyski managers
People from Bielsk Podlaski
Association footballers not categorized by position
Ekstraklasa managers
I liga managers
II liga managers